

The Gotha Ka 430 was a military transport glider, first built in 1944. The glider was designed by Albert Kalkert. Twelve had been produced by the end of  World War II, but none of them was used operationally.

A single  MG 131 machine gun was fitted for self-defence.

Specifications

References

External links
 warbirdsresourcegroup.org

1940s German military transport aircraft
Glider aircraft
Ka 430
High-wing aircraft
Aircraft first flown in 1944